Harlan & Hollingsworth was a Wilmington, Delaware, firm that constructed ships and railroad cars during the 19th century and into the 20th century.

Founding
Mahlon Betts, a carpenter, arrived in Wilmington in 1812. After helping construct many prominent buildings in the city, Betts branched out into foundry work in 1821.  In 1836, Betts partnered with Samuel Pusey (a machinist) and began manufacturing railcars at a plant on West and Water Streets in Wilmington. The next year, cabinetmaker Samuel Harlan joined the firm, then known as Betts, Pusey & Harlan. By 1839, the company claimed to have manufactured 39 passenger and 28 freight cars over the previous two years. The next year, they hired Jacob F. Sharp, a former house carpenter, to build railroad cars. He would rise to become foreman at the plant, and eventually co-founded the rival firm of Jackson and Sharp.

In 1841, Elijah Hollingsworth, brother-in-law of Harlan, bought out Pusey, and the firm became known as Betts, Harlan & Hollingsworth.  Pusey later formed competing Pusey and Jones.  In 1849 Mahlon Betts withdrew from the firm, which became simply Harlan & Hollingsworth; J. Taylor Gause was admitted as a partner in 1858, and the company became known as Harlan, Hollingsworth & Co..

Shipbuilding

Harlan & Hollingsworth's experience with railcars  and other ironwork led them to become early experimenters in iron shipbuilding. In 1842 the company hired Alexander Kelly to supervise all the millwright work. In 1843, under the encouragement of Samual Harlan, the company started engaging in marine engine building and repair.  Their first ship-related project was repairing the cylinder and other machine parts of the steamboat Sun. This small step was the beginning of what would become one of the first iron shipyards in the United States.

Harlan & Hollingsworth's expanded slowly but steadily into iron shipbuilding. Only nine ships were built between 1841 and 1851, with most of the company time taken with railroad car building and general repair work. In 1843 the company leased a launching berth on the banks of the Christiana River. The facilities at this property were limited, so all the work forming iron plates, bars, and fasteners was done at their main shop on Front and West Streets. The launch slipway was 200 feet long and could only accommodate vessels of 600 tons maximum, but this was deemed adequate for the needs of the time.

The first two hulls built by the company, the Ashland and Ocean, were two of the earliest iron steamboats to be constructed in the United States.  They were delivered to George Aspinwall of Philadelphia in 1844.  That same year the company built the Bangor, which is credited with being the first seagoing iron propeller steamship built in the United States. In 1897, the company designed the first steam pilot boat in the New York harbor, the New York.

By the early 1850s the company began to rely less on wood ship or railcar building for its income.   Machine shops, office buildings, wharves, carpenter sheds, boiler shops, blacksmith shops and cranes were added in the first five years of the decade. As the firm's reputation grew, more orders for steamboats came in from across the country. Charles Morgan, a New York shipping magnate, purchased his first ship from Harlan in 1856.  Morgan would eventually become one of the largest customers for Harlan & Hollingsworth, ordering over 31 vessels by 1878.

Business growth
This chart give an indication of the economic progress of the company from 1836 to 1860:

(Society of Naval Architects, 1943)

Civil War
Harlan and Hollingsworth was, by the time of the American Civil War,  the dominant iron shipbuilder in Wilmington, and the most prolific iron shipbuilder in the United States. By 1860 the company had built 75 iron hulls, mostly steamships along with a handful of barges. (Brown, 1951) During the Civil War the company won contracts for the construction of three monitors for the government (Patapsco, Saugus, and Napa). The Navy, however, ordered many last-minute design changes to these vessels resulting in delays while the changes were incorporated into the construction.  The extra expenses incurred reduced profits, and as a result the company became reluctant to bid on government contracts. In 1863, Jacob Sharp left their employ to form Jackson & Sharp, another car-building firm, with Job Jackson.

Postwar

In 1866 Elijah Hollingsworth died in a shipyard accident. His death greatly affected Samuel Harlan, so that shortly thereafter the partnership was dissolved and the enterprise incorporated as The Harlan & Hollingsworth Company. Harlan & Hollingsworth thrived despite competition from Jackson & Sharp and other Wilmington yards, in part because of their diversified production of railroad car building and shipbuilding. However, the Panic of 1873 and the death of Charles Morgan (their largest customer) induced the company to undertake government contracts again. These included the construction of the sloop Ranger and the long (16 year) construction of the "New Navy'' monitor USS Amphitrite (BM-2). Despite this experience Harlan & Hollingsworth constructed three more torpedo boat destroyers for the Navy, the Stringham, Hull, and Hopkins.

Other notable vessels built by Harlan & Hollingsworth include Mischief, winner of the fourth America's Cup in 1881. Another notable vessel they built in 1887 was the Yampa, which lead to other ships built for the German Emperor William II.

The company followed Jackson & Sharp into narrow gauge car building, but were not in the forefront of steel car construction. In the 1880s orders for ferries and coastal steamships started picking up again, so much that by the end of the 19th century, the company was the largest employer in Wilmington.  In 1896-1897 they built the Catawissa; it was listed on the National Register of Historic Places in 1996. Also on the National Register is the Rosinco, built by Harlan and Hollingsworth in 1916.

Bethlehem Steel era
On December 10, 1904, the company was acquired by Bethlehem Steel and operated as part of their shipbuilding division. The name changed from Harlan & Hollingsworth to the Harlan Plant of Bethlehem Steel. With 153,810 dead weight tons of steel merchant ships produced for the United States Shipping Board, Bethlehem Wilmington was a mid-field player in the World War I shipping boom. The shipyard closed in 1926, although it was reopened for a time during the Second World War and part of the shipyard was used by the Dravo Corporation until 1964. Railcars were built on the site until 1940, and parts for railroad cars until 1944. Most of the company's buildings have been demolished for new development, but the office building survives and was added to the National Register of Historic Places in 1979.

References

 David B. Tyler, The American Clyde, University of Delaware Press, 1958.
 Richard Urban, The City that Launched a Thousand Ships, Cedar Tree Books, Wilmington, DE, 1999.
 
 Henry T. Gause, Semi-Centennial Memoir of the Harlan and Hollingsworth Company, Wilmington, Del.: N.p., 1886.
 Society of Naval Architects and Marine Engineers,  Issue no 21, 1943.
 Alexander Crosby Brown, Notes on the Origins of Iron Shipbuilding in the United States, 1825-1861, Masters Thesis, College of William and Mary, Williamsburg, Virginia, 1951.

Sources

External links

Soo Line #920, a Harlan & Hollingsworth railway coach currently awaiting restoration

 

Defunct rolling stock manufacturers of the United States
Bethlehem shipyards
Wilmington Riverfront
Defunct shipbuilding companies of the United States
Historic American Engineering Record in Delaware
Companies based in Wilmington, Delaware
America's Cup yacht builders
1837 establishments in Delaware
Manufacturing companies disestablished in 1904
1904 disestablishments in Delaware
Manufacturing companies established in 1837
1904 mergers and acquisitions
Bethlehem Steel
Defunct manufacturing companies based in Delaware
American shipbuilders